Ceratophora ukuwelai, the Ukuwelas's rough-horn lizard,  is a species of agamid lizard. It is endemic to Sri Lanka.

References

Ceratophora
Reptiles of Sri Lanka
Reptiles described in 2020
Taxa named by Nikolay A. Poyarkov Jr.
Taxa named by Vladislav A. Gorin
Taxa named by Anslem de Silva